A list of films produced in Spain in 1983 (see 1983 in film).

1983

External links
 Spanish films of 1983 at the Internet Movie Database

1983
Spanish
Films